The 2018–19 East Midlands Counties Football League season was the 11th in the history of East Midlands Counties Football League, a football competition in England at level 10 of the English football league system.

League

The league featured 13 clubs from the previous season, along with seven new clubs.

Clubs relegated from the Northern Counties East League:
Clipstone
Rainworth Miners Welfare

Clubs promoted from the Central Midlands League:
Eastwood Community
Sherwood Colliery

Plus:
Heanor Town, relegated from the Midland League
Ingles, promoted from the Leicestershire Senior League
Newark Flowserve, promoted from the Nottinghamshire Senior League

League table

Stadia and locations

References

External links
 East Midlands Counties Football League

2018-19
10